Robert John Neuwirth (June 20, 1939May 18, 2022) was an American folk singer, songwriter, record producer, and visual artist.  He was noted for being the road manager and associate of Bob Dylan, as well as the co-writer of Janis Joplin's hit song "Mercedes Benz".

Early life
Neuwirth was born in Akron, Ohio, on June 20, 1939.  His father, Robert, was employed as an engineer; his mother, Clara Irene (Fischer), worked as a design engineer.  Neuwirth first started painting when he was seven years old.  He initially studied at Ohio University, before moving to Boston in 1959 when he was awarded an arts scholarship to study at the School of the Museum of Fine Arts at Tufts.  After dropping out of college, he briefly relocated to Paris and took up the banjo, guitar, and harmonica during this time.  This eventually paved the way to the folk scene of the early 1960s in Cambridge, Massachusetts.  He also went busking with Ramblin' Jack Elliott during his sojourn in the French capital.  Neuwirth later went back to Boston and was employed at an art supply store.

Career
Neuwirth first met Bob Dylan in 1961, at the inaugural Indian Neck Folk Festival held in Branford, Connecticut.  He soon became Dylan's friend and associate, as well as his road manager.  Neuwirth consequently accompanied Dylan on his England tour in 1965, the Newport Folk Festival that same year that saw the Electric Dylan controversy, and featured alongside him in D. A. Pennebaker's documentary Dont Look Back (1967).  Neuwirth pulled back from Dylan's circle after the latter's motorcycle accident in 1966 and subsequent withdrawal from public life.  However, he returned in time to help assemble the backing band for the Rolling Thunder Revue tour ten years later.  He also appeared in Dylan's own self-referential romantic fantasy/tour film Renaldo and Clara (1978).  The lower half of him appears behind Dylan in Daniel Kramer's front cover photo for the album Highway 61 Revisited.  He also intended to do a film with Edie Sedgwick – who he introduced to Dylan in 1965 – before her death in 1971.

With Janis Joplin and poet Michael McClure, Neuwirth co-wrote the song "Mercedes Benz" in August 1970, while improvising during a drinking session at a bar in Port Chester, New York.  He scribbled the lyrics onto a napkin, which Joplin sang at her Capitol Theatre show that same night and then recorded a cappella just three days before she died.  Neuwirth also introduced Kris Kristofferson to Joplin, who would have a major posthumous hit single with Kristofferson's song "Me and Bobby McGee", which Neuwirth first played for Joplin.  Colin Irwin wrote:Painter, road manager, sidekick, confidante, henchman, poet, underground cult hero, womanizer, party organizer, self-appointed king of cool, and baiter-in-chief of Baez, Donovan, and any other unfortunate who wound up in the line of fire of his sledgehammer jibes, Neuwirth went on to become a film-maker and a credible singer-songwriter in his own right, co-writing the wonderful "Mercedes Benz" with his friend Janis Joplin.

After relocating to Los Angeles during the 1970s, Neuwirth released his debut album Bob Neuwirth (1974) with Asylum Records.  Although it included guest artists such as Kris Kristofferson, Booker T. Jones, Rita Coolidge, Chris Hillman, Cass Elliot, Dusty Springfield, Don Everly, Richie Furay, and Iain Matthews, it was not commercially successful, in part because he declined to publicize it extensively.  The album eventually became a cult favorite and a proposal to reissue it was in place at the time of Neuwirth's death.  Fourteen years later, he released his second album, Back to the Front, which was received more positively by critics.  His following album, a collaboration with John Cale titled Last Day on Earth (1994), was described by The Daily Telegraph as "ambitious, experimental and doom-laden".  While embarking on a national tour of the U.S., he recorded his next solo album, Look Up (1996), at the residences of friends such as Patti Smith, Bernie Leadon, and Elliott Murphy.  He subsequently travelled to Havana to collaborate with José María Vitier on Havana Midnight (1999), which was characterized as a wholehearted effort at fusion between folk and blues with Cuban music.

Neuwirth was involved in concerts at a church in Brooklyn and the Royal Festival Hall in 1999, which were organized by Hal Willner as a tribute to the Anthology of American Folk Music released almost 50 years before.  A year later, Neuwirth produced the documentary Down from the Mountain, with Pennebaker as one of the directors and highlighting artists whose music was included in O Brother, Where Art Thou? by the Coen brothers.  He also took part in music projects involving various artists at the turn of the millennium, namely Por Vida: A Tribute to the Songs of Alejandro Escovedo and Rogue's Gallery: Pirate Ballads, Sea Songs, and Chanteys.  He was interviewed by Martin Scorsese for No Direction Home (2005), and featured in Rolling Thunder Revue: A Bob Dylan Story by Martin Scorsese fourteen years later.

Personal life
Neuwirth was in a domestic partnership with Paula Batson until his death.  He resided in Santa Monica, California, during his later years.  He carried on painting throughout this time at a studio in the Meatpacking District in New York, and identified Jackson Pollock as his main inspiration that guided Neuwirth's colourful and abstract style.  His artwork was displayed at Track 16 Gallery in a 2011 exhibition titled "Overs & Unders: Paintings by Bob Neuwirth, 1964–2009".

Neuwirth died on the evening of May 18, 2022, in Santa Monica.  He was 82, and had heart failure prior to his death.

Discography

Solo
 1974: Bob Neuwirth (Asylum)
 1988: Back to the Front (Gold Castle)
 1990: 99 Monkeys (Gold Castle)
 1996: Look Up (Watermelon)
 1999: Havana Midnight (Dreamsville Records)

With John Cale
 1994: Last Day on Earth (MCA)

Other contributions
The Band of Blacky Ranchette – Still Lookin' Good to Me (Thrill Jockey, 2003)
Por Vida: A Tribute to the Songs of Alejandro Escovedo – "Rosalie" (Independent release, 2004)
Rogue's Gallery: Pirate Ballads, Sea Songs, and Chanteys – Various Artists, 2006
The Kropotkins – Portents of Love, producer, 2015
Vince Bell – Ojo, producer, 2018

Bibliography
Baby, Let Me Follow You Down: The Illustrated Story of the Cambridge Folk Years, by Eric von Schmidt and Jim Rooney

References

External links
 Bob Neuwirth's home page
 "for bob neuwirth", a poem by Patti Smith
 Photos of Neuwirth in the 1960s
 Illustrated Bob Neuwirth discography
 
 

1939 births
2022 deaths
20th-century American male singers
20th-century American singers
21st-century American male singers
21st-century American singers
Bob Dylan
Musicians from Akron, Ohio
Record producers from Ohio
Songwriters from Ohio